William Dyer (born 25 February 1987 in Glasgow) is a Scottish professional footballer, who plays for Drumchapel United.

He has previously played for St Johnstone, Brechin City, Raith Rovers, Greenock Morton, Dundee, Dumbarton and East Stirlingshire.

Career
Dyer began his career at St Johnstone, progressing through the club's youth ranks.

In September 2007, he went on loan to Brechin City. He returned to Saints in December after making nine appearances for Brechin. He made a permanent move to Brechin in January 2008.

On 20 May 2010, he was confirmed as a new signing for Raith Rovers on a two-year full-time deal.

Dyer signed for Greenock Morton in May 2012, under freedom of contract. His contract expired in May 2013.

On 5 June 2013, Dyer signed for Dundee along with fellow former Morton player Peter MacDonald. Dyer made his debut for the club in the first round of the Scottish Challenge Cup, in a 1–0 win over Alloa Athletic, where he came on for Kevin McBride in the 79th minute. He soon made his league debut in a 0–0 draw against Raith Rovers. After making twenty-four appearances in all competitions, as Dundee won the Scottish Championship and promotion to the Scottish Premiership, Dyer signed a two-year contract extension. He left Dundee at the end of the 2014–15 season, having not been offered a new contract.

After his release by Dundee, Dyer re-signed with Brechin City for the third time. After three seasons at Glebe Park, Dyer signed a one-year deal with Dumbarton in May 2018 however was released from the club in May 2019 after making just 21 appearances - and not featuring after the start of January, joining Lowland League East Stirlingshire a month later.

Dyer signed for his local club Drumchapel United at the end of April 2020.

Career statistics

Honours
Dundee
Scottish Championship: 2013–14

References

External links
St Johnstone's official site profile
 (pre-Raith)
 (since Raith)

See also
2012–13 Greenock Morton F.C. season

1987 births
Footballers from Glasgow
Living people
Scottish footballers
Scottish Football League players
St Johnstone F.C. players
Brechin City F.C. players
Raith Rovers F.C. players
Association football defenders
Greenock Morton F.C. players
Dundee F.C. players
Scottish Professional Football League players
Dumbarton F.C. players
Drumchapel United F.C. players
West of Scotland Football League players